Kapotte Muziek is the musical improvisation project of Frans de Waard, Peter Duimelinks and Roel Meelkop. Active since 1984, it is one of the most internationally visible improvisation and experimental projects hailing from the Netherlands. The group began as the solo noise music project of Frans de Waard, who published more than fifty cassettes and several LPs using this name. Duimelinks joined to make it a duo for Kapotte Muziek's first US tour, then Roel Meelkop was added later. The trio toured the US once, playing as both Kapotte Muziek and as Goem, their techno music alter ego. Currently, all Kapotte Muziek music is recorded live by the trio, while de Waard's solo work is published using a variety of aliases, such as Quest, Shifts, and Freiband.

Kapotte Muziek by..

Several artists have been reworking pieces or live documents by Kapotte Muziek into a series of new pieces generically called Kapotte Muziek by.
Here is a list of the artists involved :
 (1) RLW ( 7", 1997, Korm Plastics )
 (2) Illusion of Safety ( 7", 1997, Korm Plastics )
 (3) Lasse Marhaug ( 7", 1998, Korm Plastics )
 (4) Leif Elggren ( 7", 1998, Korm Plastics )
 (5) DMDN ( not released )
 (6) Radboud Mens ( 7", 1998, Korm Plastics )
 (7) Wiklund / Stavöstrand ( 7", 1999, Korm Plastics )
 (8) Asmus Tietchens ( 7", 2000, Korm Plastics )
 (9) Troum ( 7", 2001, Korm Plastics )
 (10) Stephan Mathieu ( CD-EP, 2003, Korm Plastics )
 (11) Toshiya Tsunoda ( CD, 2004, Korm Plastics )
 (12) Thurston Moore ( CD, 2004, Korm Plastics )
 (13) Richard Chartier / Boca Raton ( CD, 2005, Korm Plastics )
 (14) Peter Rehberg ( CD-EP, 2006, Korm Plastics )
 Freiband ( CD-R Business card, 2007, Moll )
 Five Elements Music ( CD-R, 2008, Moving Furniture Records )

Name
In Dutch, Kapotte Muziek means broken music.

See also
Goem

References

External links
Conversation with Goem/Kapotte Muziek
Kapotte Muziek discography at Discogs.com
Kapotte Muziek 25th birthday : Archives

Dutch industrial music groups
Dutch experimental musical groups
Free improvisation
Noise musical groups